The Wyalusing Valley Junior-Senior High School, commonly referred to as WVHS, is a Northeastern Pennsylvania public high school.  The school is operated by the Wyalusing Area School District.

Vocational opportunities 
WVHS has access to a vocational school called Northern Tier Career Center (NTCC) in Towanda for students that wish to advance in a hands-on or technical career. This vocational education is available to students who are in 11th and 12th grades.

Athletics 
WVHS has many school-sponsored athletic activities, including football, wrestling, basketball, (girls only) soccer, baseball, softball, track and field, volleyball, golf and cross country. In addition, there are cheerleading squads for the football and basketball teams.

Clubs 
WVHS has many clubs meant to help the community or further learning outside of the classroom in a certain subject including: Yearbook, a computer club, FBLA, FHA, chorus, band, library club, orchestra, SADD, marching band, student council, ski club, Spanish club, Envirothon, Leo Club, Science Olympiad, and Youth and Government.

References

External links 
 

Public high schools in Pennsylvania
Schools in Bradford County, Pennsylvania
Public middle schools in Pennsylvania